The LEAF (Linux Embedded Appliance Framework) Project is a collection of Linux distributions that began as a fork from the Linux Router Project (LRP) "linux-on-a-floppy" distribution. Most users of these distributions are primarily interested in router and firewall functions, particularly as combined with the convenience of major features of general Linux distributions such as shells, packet filtering, SSH servers, DNS services, file servers, webmin and the like.  LEAF is a common choice when commercial NAT routers are insufficiently flexible or secure, or are unattractively nonconformant to open source philosophy.

Characteristics
LEAF is capable of running a powerful NAT firewall with several ancillary services on computer hardware generally considered obsolete, such as 486 workstations with no hard disk.

LEAF is intended to work well with read-only storage media, such as write-protected floppy drives or optical discs.  Distribution sizes range from a single floppy disk to several hundred megabytes.

LEAF distributions typically include software designed to be economical in executable size, such as uClibc, BusyBox, Dropbear, and Shorewall.

LEAF's origins lie in Debian Sarge, though many boot processes and daemon control mechanisms have been modified heavily.

See also 
 List of router or firewall distributions
 Alpine Linux

References

External links
 LEAF Linux Embedded Appliance Framework project documentation
 LEAF Linux Embedded Appliance Framework project homepage at sourceforge
 LEAF Linux Embedded Appliance Framework page at Ohloh
 An article at LWN.net discussing LRP/LEAF as an example of underappreciated free software
 An article from Network World listing LEAF as one of "25 free open source projects IT pros will love"

Floppy-based Linux distributions
Free routing software
Gateway/routing/firewall distribution
Light-weight Linux distributions
Linux distributions